"I Don't Want To" is a song recorded by American R&B singer Toni Braxton for her second studio album, Secrets (1996). It was released as the third single from the album on March 11, 1997; in the United States it was released as a double A-side with "I Love Me Some Him". Written and produced by R. Kelly, the R&B ballad describes the agony of a break-up. The song was well received by music critics, who were complimentary about Kelly's production.

The single reached the top-ten in Iceland, Ireland and the United Kingdom, and the top-twenty in six countries, including Canada and the United States, where it shot to number 19 on the Billboard Hot 100 and number nine on the Billboard Hot R&B/Hip-Hop Songs chart during the summer of 1997. While not as successful as the two preceding singles, it became her third consecutive chart-topper on the Billboard Hot Dance Club Play chart in July 1997, following "You're Makin' Me High" and "Un-Break My Heart".

The accompanying music video was shot during a hectic time in Braxton's career. After the commercial success from the preceding singles and co-headlining a tour with Kenny G, Braxton was exhausted. The time schedule for a video was roughly one day for director Bille Woodruff. A simple video featured Braxton wandering around in a white room wearing a white tanktop, blue jeans and a built up shoe.

Composition 
"I Don't Want To" was written and produced by R. Kelly, who was also responsible for all instruments, background vocals and mixing. Braxton provided both lead and background vocals. It was recorded at Middle Ear Studio, Miami Beach, Florida. According to the sheet music published at Musicnotes.com by Universal Music Publishing Group, "I Don't Want To" is written in the key of B major with a moderate tempo of 109 beats per minute. Braxton's vocal range spans from the low note of F3 to the high note of G4. It follows in the chord progression of B–B9-G#7sus4-G#7–C#m-C#m(maj7)-C#m7-F#7. The midtempo R&B ballad talks about the agony of heartbreak. It also touches upon themes of loss and abstinence.

Critical reception 
Stephen Thomas Erlewine of AllMusic praised R. Kelly's composition, noting that he "demonstrate[s] why [he is] considered [one] of the top songwriters in '90s R&B and soul." Larry Flick of Billboard praised its groove, which according to him, "is masterfully woven by R. Kelly," adding: "He smartly keeps the musical melodrama to a minimum, opting instead for a smooth and subtle jeep-soul setting that leaves plenty of room for La B to flex her rich vocal range. A reviewer from Music Week rated the song three out of five, complimenting it as "another surefire hit ballad" from the Secrets album. The magazine's Alan Jones described it as "another stately ballad performed with grace and style. Braxton is A Real Singer, but prefers to take the most direct route between two notes, unlike many of her ability. Another monster hit." David Fricke of Rolling Stone also praised Kelly, noting that "the unruffled tenor of the music, however, puts the focus squarely on Braxton, and she's up to it." He described the song as "a quiet groan of loss and abstinence." Ian Hyland from Sunday Mirror gave it eight out of ten, commenting, "Another aching soul-searcher from the most beautiful woman in America. It should be almost as successful as "Un-Break My Heart" but it's a bit too slow for a dance remix. Not that anyone cares about the song anyway - we just want to see her in that video." David Sinclair from The Times declared it as a "plush power ballad" from the soul diva, and "a guaranteed smash." Richard Harrington from The Washington Post wrote, "With a slow, deliberate pulse and anguished mood reminiscent of "Breathe Again", it stirs the ashes of emotional burnout for someone who is taking separation as hard as it can be taken."

Release and commercial performance 
"I Don't Want To" was released as the album's third single on March 11, 1997. In the United States, the song was released as a double A-side with "I Love Me Some Him". On March 31, 1997, the song was released in the United Kingdom. Commercially, "I Don't Want To" proved to be moderately successful in the United States, reaching number nineteen on the US Billboard Hot 100, while peaking at number nine on the Billboard Hot R&B/Hip-Hop Songs chart. The song also became her third consecutive chart-topper on the Billboard Hot Dance Club Play chart in July 1997, following "You're Makin' Me High" and "Un-Break My Heart". In the United Kingdom, "I Don't Want To" became Braxton's third consecutive top-ten single from Secrets, peaking at number nine. In New Zealand, the song debuted at number 31, and two weeks later climbed to number 21, becoming its peak position. In Sweden, the song debuted at number 57, climbing to number 29 in the second week. Two weeks later, the song peaked at number 15, falling on the two following weeks until it climbed to its peak position once again. It later remained for further six weeks on the charts.

Music video 
The accompanying music video for the song was directed by Bille Woodruff and shot on March 4, 1997. The video was filmed during a hectic time in Braxton's career, and after the commercial success from the preceding singles and co-headlining a tour with Kenny G, Braxton was exhausted and it was shot in one day. The video was considered simple, featuring Braxton wandering around in a white room wearing a white tanktop, blue jeans and a built up shoe. The original treatment for the video was a one-take version. Woodruff told MTV News that he shot multiple takes and at the end of the day, the best version would be picked. The video had Braxton walking around a house, trying on various wigs and scrubbing her feet in a bathtub. However, Braxton made a "creative decision to scrap the first shoot in favor of a simpler, non-bathroom video," after MTV News staff mentioned while interviewing Braxton that Jewel, Tony Rich, and No Doubt had recently used bathrooms as music video backdrops (in "Who Will Save Your Soul", "Nobody Knows", and "Just a Girl" respectively).

The video for "I Don't Want To" was published on Braxton's official YouTube channel in October 2009. It has amassed more than 32 million views as of September 2021.

Track listings and formats

 US double A-side CD single with "I Love Me Some Him"
"I Don't Want To" (Album Version) – 4:17
"I Love Me Some Him" (Album Version) – 5:09

 US double A-side CD maxi single with "I Love Me Some Him"
"I Don't Want To" (Album Version) – 4:17
"I Don't Want To" (Frankie Knuckles Club Mix) – 10:57
"I Don't Want To" (Instrumental) – 4:19
"I Love Me Some Him" (Album Version) – 5:09
"Un-Break My Heart" (Billboard Award Show Version) – 4:12

 UK CD 1
"I Don't Want To" (Album Version) – 4:15
"I Don't Want To" (Frankie Knuckles Radio Edit) – 4:17
"You're Makin' Me High" (Hot Ice Dancehall Mix featuring Mad Cobra) – 4:50
"I Don't Want To" (Franktified Club Mix) – 10:57

 UK CD 2
"I Don't Want To" (Album Version) – 4:15
"I Don't Want To" (Classic Club Mix) – 10:54
"I Don't Want To" (Deep Jays Delight) – 9:02

 European CD single
"I Don't Want To" (Album Version) – 4:15
"I Don't Want To" (Frankie Knuckles Radio Edit) – 4:17
"I Don't Want To" (Franktified Club Mix) – 10:57

Charts and certifications

Weekly charts

Year-end charts

Certifications

See also
List of number-one dance singles of 1997 (U.S.)

References

External links

1990s ballads
1996 songs
1997 singles
Music videos directed by Bille Woodruff
Contemporary R&B ballads
Toni Braxton songs
Songs written by R. Kelly
Song recordings produced by R. Kelly
LaFace Records singles
Songs about heartache